Wantoat/Leron Rural LLG is a local-level government (LLG) of Morobe Province, Papua New Guinea.

Wards
01. Matak
02. Mataya
03. Guningwan
04. Arawik
05. Umbaku
06. Yaparwguan
07. Gwambongwak
08. Sengapan
09. Kubung
10. Uyam
11. Bumbum
12. Daimsot
13. Ewok
14. Ginonga
15. Kamang
16. Gumia
17. Daku
18. Sukurum (Sukurum language speakers)
19. Som (Sarasira language speakers)
20. Ngariawang

References

Local-level governments of Morobe Province